Álvaro Vega Suárez (born 15 March 1991) is a Spanish footballer who plays for CD Alcoyano as a central defender.

Club career
Born in Huelva, Andalusia, Vega graduated from RCD Espanyol's youth setup, and made his senior debut for the reserves in the 2009–10 season, in the Segunda División B. In January 2010 he joined another reserve team, Atlético Onubense of Tercera División.

Vega made his debut with the first team of the latter on 27 August 2011, starting in a 1–0 away loss against Deportivo de La Coruña in the Segunda División. He appeared in four matches during the season and renewed his contract on 13 August 2012, being immediately loaned to third-tier CD San Roque de Lepe.

Vega returned to Recre in January 2013, being definitely promoted to the main squad. After appearing sparingly, he moved to Granada CF on 17 January of the following year, being assigned to the B side.

In June 2014, Vega was deemed surplus to requirements by Granada. He cut ties with the club on 28 August, and signed for CF Badalona hours later.

References

External links

1991 births
Living people
Spanish footballers
Footballers from Huelva
Association football defenders
Segunda División players
Segunda División B players
Tercera División players
Primera Federación players
RCD Espanyol B footballers
Atlético Onubense players
Recreativo de Huelva players
CD San Roque de Lepe footballers
Club Recreativo Granada players
CF Badalona players
Linares Deportivo footballers
CD Atlético Baleares footballers
Real Balompédica Linense footballers
UE Cornellà players
CF Rayo Majadahonda players
CD Alcoyano footballers